Elections to the Territorial Council were held in the French overseas collectivity of Saint Barthélemy for the first time on 1 July 2007. Since Bruno Magras, the incumbent mayor of Saint Barthélemy, got an absolute majority in the first round, a second round was not held. If a second round had been necessary, it would have been held on 8 July 2007.

Results

References

2007 in Saint Barthélemy
Saint Barthélemy
Saint Barthélemy
2007 in France
Elections in Saint Barthélemy
July 2007 events in North America